The 2021 Trampoline Gymnastics World Age Group Competitions were held from November 25 to 28, 2021, in the National Gymnastics Arena in Baku, Azerbaijan, with 669 competitors aged 11 to 21 from 32 countries. The event was held one week after the 2021 Trampoline Gymnastics World Championships in the same venue.


Participating nations

  (16)
  (16)
  (34)
  (15)
  (21)
  (9)
  (10)
  (15)
  (11)
  (3)
  (8)
  (30)
  (7)
  (24)
  (53)
  (3)
  (30)
  (10)
  (22)
  (16)
  (2)
  (27)
  (7)
  (78)
  (80)
  (1)
  (3)
  (14)
  (13)
  (14)
  (7)
  (22)
  (48)

(Number of competitors in brackets)

Disciplines
The four disciplines of the championship are:
 Trampolining (individual)
 Synchronized trampolining
 Tumbling
 Double mini trampoline
In each discipline, events were held for male and female competitors and for the four age groups 11–12, 13–14, 15-16 and 17–21, for a total of 32 events.

Medal table

References

Trampoline competitions
2021 competitions
Sports competitions in Baku